Herbert L. Williams (born February 16, 1958) is an American former basketball player in the National Basketball Association (NBA) for eighteen seasons from 1981 to 1999. Williams served as the interim head coach and the assistant coach of the NBA's New York Knicks. He was last an assistant coach for the New York Liberty of the WNBA.

College career
Williams was a four-year starter for the Ohio State Buckeyes, scoring 2,011 points (then a team record) and pulling down 1,111 rebounds (still second in team history only to Jerry Lucas).  Williams is the school leader in career field goals made, with 834 in 114 games. He is second all-time in career blocked shots with 328.

Williams was named to the All-Big Ten team as a junior, when Ohio State finished the year with a 21-8 record and advanced to the NCAA regionals. He led the Buckeyes in scoring that year with an average of 17.6 points per game.

Williams was a team co-captain in both his junior and senior years.

Professional career

Williams was a first-round draft choice of the Indiana Pacers in 1981, where he played from 1982 to 1989 and had his most productive years.

He was traded to the Dallas Mavericks midway through the 1988–1989 season on February 22 in exchange for forward Detlef Schrempf.

In 1992, he was signed by the New York Knicks, where he spent seven years backing up perennial All-Star Patrick Ewing. Williams played one game (31 minutes) for the Toronto Raptors in 1996 before being waived and quickly returned to the Knicks. The team made the 1994 and 1999 NBA Finals, with Williams serving as a team leader.

After the 1999 Finals, Williams retired at the age of forty-one after six regular season games and eight playoff games in 1999. Four years later, he returned to the Knicks as an assistant coach. He worked under head coaches Don Chaney and Lenny Wilkens. When Wilkens resigned in 2005, Williams took over as head coach.

On July 26, 2005, Larry Brown was hired as the head coach of the Knicks, thus ending Williams's head coaching tenure. Williams was the acting head coach of the Knicks for the final two games of the 2005–2006 season, when illness kept Larry Brown away from the bench for the final two games of his Knicks career.

After that season, Brown was fired by the Knicks and replaced as head coach by Isiah Thomas. Williams worked as an assistant coach under Thomas and Mike D'Antoni, and continued to be in the coaching staff under Mike Woodson until Phil Jackson fired the entire staff in 2014. He has coached for the Knicks' NBA Summer League team.

On March 26, 2015, Williams was hired as the assistant coach of the WNBA's New York Liberty.

Head coaching record

|- 
| style="text-align:left;"|New York
| style="text-align:left;"|
| 1||1||0|||| style="text-align:center;"|(interim)||—||—||—||—
| style="text-align:center;"|—
|- 
| style="text-align:left;"|New York
| style="text-align:left;"|
| 43||16||27|||| style="text-align:center;"|5th in Atlantic||—||—||—||—
| style="text-align:center;"|Missed playoffs
|- class="sortbottom"
| style="text-align:center;" colspan="2"|Career
| 44||17||27|||| ||—||—||—||—
| style="text-align:center;"|—

See also
List of National Basketball Association career blocks leaders
List of NCAA Division I men's basketball players with 2000 points and 1000 rebounds

References

External links
 BasketballReference.com: Herb Williams (as coach)
 BasketballReference.com: Herb Williams (as player)
 NBA.com coach file: Herb Williams
 

1958 births
Living people
African-American basketball coaches
African-American basketball players
All-American college men's basketball players
American expatriate basketball people in Canada
American men's basketball players
Basketball coaches from Ohio
Basketball players from Columbus, Ohio
Centers (basketball)
Dallas Mavericks players
Indiana Pacers draft picks
Indiana Pacers players
New York Knicks assistant coaches
New York Knicks head coaches
New York Knicks players
New York Liberty coaches
Ohio State Buckeyes men's basketball players
Parade High School All-Americans (boys' basketball)
Power forwards (basketball)
Sportspeople from Columbus, Ohio
Toronto Raptors players
21st-century African-American people
20th-century African-American sportspeople